Fort Defiance is an unincorporated community in Augusta County, Virginia, United States. It is part of the Staunton–Waynesboro Micropolitan Statistical Area.

History
Augusta Stone Church was established in the area now known as Fort Defiance in 1740. Local legend claims the church was used as a haven during the French and Indian War, when Augusta County was the western frontier for the country. The name Fort Defiance was not put on the community until the late 19th century.

Sites of interest
 Augusta Military Academy, a now-defunct military academy that was one of the first in the nation to adopt the JROTC program and site of historical marker VA-A100 Augusta Military Academy;
 Augusta Stone Church, the oldest Presbyterian Church in continuous use in Virginia;
 Historical Marker VA-A99 Willow Spout, a willow tree planted in the mid-19th century over a spring so that water was driven out a spout driven in the tree's side into a wooden trough;

Education
Fort Defiance is served by Augusta County Public Schools. Clymore Elementary School, Stewart Middle School and Fort Defiance High School are within the unincorporated area's boundaries.

References

Unincorporated communities in Augusta County, Virginia
Unincorporated communities in Virginia